Isaac Bardavid (13 February 1931 – 1 February 2022) was a Brazilian actor of Jewish-Turkish origin.

Bardavid was considered one of the great names in Brazilian dubbing, having voiced characters such as Doctor Eggman, Wolverine, Freddy Krueger, Tigger, and Skeletor - Bardavid's voicing of Wolverine awarded him a commend from actor Hugh Jackman himself. As an actor, he became known for playing the overseer Francisco in Escrava Isaura. Born in Brazil, he died on 1 February 2022, at the age of 90.

Filmography

References

1931 births
2022 deaths
Brazilian male television actors
Brazilian male voice actors
People from Niterói
20th-century Brazilian male actors
21st-century Brazilian male actors